The third season of the HBO television series Boardwalk Empire premiered on September 16, 2012 and concluded on December 2, 2012, consisting of 12 episodes.  The series was created by Terence Winter and based on the book Boardwalk Empire: The Birth, High Times and Corruption of Atlantic City by Nelson Johnson. Set in Atlantic City, New Jersey, during the Prohibition era, the series stars Steve Buscemi as Enoch "Nucky" Thompson (based on the historical Enoch "Nucky" Johnson), a political figure who rose to prominence and controlled Atlantic City, New Jersey, during the Prohibition period of the 1920s and early 1930s. Taking place 16 months after season two, the third season begins on New Year's Eve 1922 and concludes in June 1923. The third season was released on DVD and Blu-ray in region 1 on August 20, 2013.

Cast

Main
Charlie Cox was promoted to main cast after recurring in the previous season, and Bobby Cannavale joined the cast. Michael Pitt, Aleksa Palladino, Paz de la Huerta and Dabney Coleman all departed the cast.
 Steve Buscemi as Enoch "Nucky" Thompson
 Kelly Macdonald as Margaret Thompson
 Michael Shannon as Nelson Van Alden/George Mueller
 Shea Whigham as Elias "Eli" Thompson
 Michael Stuhlbarg as Arnold Rothstein
 Stephen Graham as Al Capone
 Vincent Piazza as Charlie Luciano
 Michael Kenneth Williams as Albert "Chalky" White
 Anthony Laciura as Eddie Kessler
 Paul Sparks as Mieczyslaw "Mickey Doyle" Kuzik
 Jack Huston as Richard Harrow
 Charlie Cox as Owen Sleater
 Bobby Cannavale as Gyp Rosetti
 Gretchen Mol as Gillian Darmody

Recurring

Episodes

Reception

Critical reception
The third season of Boardwalk Empire received positive reviews from critics, with Bobby Cannavale being singled out for praise. On the review aggregator website Metacritic, the third season scored 76/100 based on 15 reviews.  Another aggregator website, Rotten Tomatoes, reported 84% of critics gave the third season a "Certified Fresh" rating, based on 25 reviews with an average score of 8.6/10, with the site consensus stating "As hot-headed mobster Gyp Rosetti, Bobby Cannavale brings a sense of danger and energy to this season of Boardwalk Empire, which remains lavish, twisty, and violent."

Awards and nominations
The third season received 10 Primetime Emmy Award nominations for the 65th Primetime Emmy Awards and won 5 altogether. Bobby Cannavale won for Outstanding Supporting Actor in a Drama Series, and the series won the awards for Outstanding Art Direction for a Single-Camera Series ("Sunday Best"), Outstanding Hairstyling for a Single-Camera Series ("Resolution"), Outstanding Sound Editing For A Series ("The Milkmaid's Lot"), and Outstanding Sound Mixing for a Comedy or Drama Series ("The Milkmaid's Lot"). Tim Van Patten was nominated for Outstanding Directing for a Drama Series for "Margate Sands", and the series also received nominations for Outstanding Cinematography for a Single-Camera Series ("Margate Sands"), Outstanding Costumes for a Series ("Resolution"), Outstanding Makeup for a Single-Camera Series (Non-Prosthetic) ("Resolution"), and Outstanding Special Visual Effects in a Supporting Role ("The Pony").

References

External links 
 
 

Boardwalk Empire
2012 American television seasons
Fiction set in 1923
Fiction set in 1922
fr:Boardwalk Empire#Troisième saison (2012)